Melvin Keith Burns (born September 26, 1960) is an American football coach. He served as head football coach at the University of Tulsa from 2000 to 2002, compiling an overall college football record of seven wins and 28 losses. Burns has also been the defensive coordinator at Pacific, USC, University of Arkansas and San Jose State. While at Arkansas in 1998, Burns was a finalist for the Broyles Award, given annually to the nation's top college football assistant coach. He was also an assistant special teams coach for the Oakland Raiders of the National Football League (NFL). After serving as assistant head coach and defensive coordinator for Archbishop Mitty High School in San Jose, Burns was promoted to head coach effective for 2015. Currently Keith Burns is coaching high school football at Fort Worth Country Day School in Fort Worth, Texas.

Head coaching record

College

References

External links
 UTEP profile
 San Jose State profile
 Tulsa profile

1960 births
Living people
American football defensive backs
Arkansas Razorbacks football coaches
Arkansas Razorbacks football players
High school football coaches in California
Kansas State Wildcats football coaches
Oakland Raiders coaches
Pacific Tigers football coaches
Rice Owls football coaches
San Jose State Spartans football coaches
Tulsa Golden Hurricane football coaches
USC Trojans football coaches
People from Hurst, Texas